Frederik Pieter "Freek" Schipper (born 25 October 1983) is a Dutch professional footballer who currently plays for Hong Kong Premier League club HKFC.

Club career

HKFC 
Freek would join HKFC on the 1st of July 2008 from Mutual.

He would make his 250th appearance for the club on the 4th of September following a 1-0 victory over Sham Shui Po.

References

Living people
1983 births
Dutch footballers
Association football midfielders
Hong Kong First Division League players
Hong Kong Premier League players
Hong Kong FC players
Dutch expatriate footballers
Dutch expatriate sportspeople in Hong Kong
Expatriate footballers in Hong Kong